James Playfair McMurrich,  (October 16, 1859 – February 9, 1939) was a Canadian zoologist and academic.

Born in Toronto, the son of John McMurrich, McMurrich received a M.A. from the University of Toronto in 1881 and a Ph.D. from Johns Hopkins University in  1885.

From 1881 to 1884, he was a Professor of biology and horticulture at Ontario Agricultural College in the University of Guelph. From 1892 to 1894, he taught at the University of Cincinnati. He was a Professor of Anatomy in homoeopathic department of the University of Michigan. From 1907 to 1930, he was Professor of anatomy at the University of Toronto.

From 1922 to 1923, he was the president of the Royal Society of Canada. In 1922, he was the president of the American Association for the Advancement of Science. In 1933, he was the president of the History of Science Society. In 1939, he was awarded the Royal Society of Canada's Flavelle Medal.

In 1882, he married Katie Moodie Vickers.

Selected bibliography
 A text-book of invertebrate morphology (1894)
 Leonardo da Vinci: The Anatomist (1930)

References

External links 
 James Playfair McMurrich and McMurrich Family archival papers held at the University of Toronto Archives and Records Management Services

Canadian zoologists
1859 births
1939 deaths
Fellows of the Royal Society of Canada
University of Toronto alumni
University of Michigan faculty